Azygophleps albovittata is a moth in the  family Cossidae. It is found in Nigeria, Ghana, Uganda, the Democratic Republic of the Congo, Kenya, Guinea and Zimbabwe.

The larvae are a pest of groundnuts. Since groundnuts were only introduced into Africa 400 to 500 years ago, there must be at least one other host plant. The larvae cause massive damage to the crown of the plant.

References

Moths described in 1908
Azygophleps
Insects of West Africa
Insects of Uganda
Moths of Africa